The Bridal Chair is a British silent motion picture of 1919 directed by G. B. Samuelson and starring Miriam J. Sabbage, C. M. Hallard, Daisy Burrell and Mary Rorke. A drama, it was written by Samuelson and Roland Pertwee.

The film was premiered at a Trade Show in July 1919.

Plot
Sylvane Sheridan is a cripple in a wheelchair, engaged to Lord Louis Lewis, a faithful middle-aged man who resists the temptation to abandon her for other young ladies, such as Jill Hargreaves. He has vowed not to marry anyone else while Sylvane survives.

Cast
 
 Miriam J. Sabbage – Sylvane Sheridan
 C. M. Hallard – Lord Louis Lewis
 Daisy Burrell – Jill Hargreaves
 Mary Rorke – Mrs Sheridan 
 John Kelt –  Butler

References

External links

1919 films
1910s English-language films
Films directed by G. B. Samuelson
Films set in England
British silent feature films
British black-and-white films
British drama films
1919 drama films
Silent drama films
1910s British films